Hamit Arslan (born 1894, date of death unknown) was a Turkish footballer. He played in five matches for the Turkey national football team from 1924 to 1925. He was also part of Turkey's squad for the football tournament at the 1924 Summer Olympics, but he did not play in any matches.

References

External links
 

1894 births
Year of death missing
Turkish footballers
Turkey international footballers
Place of birth missing
Association football midfielders
Altay S.K. footballers
Footballers at the 1924 Summer Olympics
Olympic footballers of Turkey